Dindefelo Falls, located in the town of Dindefelo, is a tourist attraction and park in southeast Senegal. It is located just a few miles from the Guinean border.  The falls are about 100 meters high. The park area forms part of the larger Niokolo-Koba National Park, a UNESCO Biosphere world heritage site. UNESCO estimates the annual tourist visits to the falls is in the thousands.

References

 dakar.unesco.org. 
Niokolo-Koba National Park UNESCO Site
UNESCO Natural Site Data Sheet
Ministère de l’Environnement, de la Protection de la nature, des Bassins de rétention et des Lacs artificiels: Parcs et réserves, 13 October 2005.

Waterfalls of Senegal
Tourism in Senegal